Marvin Robert Kaisersatt is an American woodcarver. He was born in Montgomery, Minnesota February 1, 1939 to Bessie and Benjamin Kaisersatt.

Career

After high school in Montgomery, MN, Kaisersatt graduated from St. John's University in Collegeville, MN with a degree in Mathematics. He then joined the US Army and spent time overseas before leaving the military early to teach math at Escuela San Antonio Abad in Humaca, Puerto Rico. He then moved to Monticello, MN, where he continued to teach before moving to Faribault in 1976 where he taught math until his retirement in 1995.

He began wood carving seriously in 1976 during a teacher's strike. A caricature carver, he specializes in carving multi-figure scenes from a single block of basswood. Pieces take on a sculptural quality through the interplay of mass and space. The carvings are finished with sealer, but not varnished, and presented either without color, or with a hand-painted, detailed, watercolor finish and then waxed.

Kaisersatt has taught classes (held through Whillock Studios and CCA) focusing on design, clay modeling, and carving technique. He is a founding member of the Caricature Carvers of America, which is dedicated to promoting the art of caricature carving. His favorite caricaturist is Al Hirschfeld. Cartooning and caricatures play a large role in Kaisersatt's designs and story lines. His book, Creating Caricature Heads in Wood and on Paper explains carving caricature heads and lays out a detailed procedure for designing them. Kaisersatt has also authored multiple teaching articles  published in Woodcarver's Magazine.

Awards

Kaisersatt's awards include honors from the International Woodcarvers Congress in Davenport, Iowa where he has won “Best of Caricatures” in 9 of 10 years, the Upper Midwest Woodcarvers Expo in Blue Earth, Minnesota and the Nordic Fest Woodcarving Exhibition in Decorah, Iowa. 
He was chosen as Wood Carving Illustrated magazine's wood carver of the year in 2006, and Kaisersatt was featured in the Fall 2007 edition of Woodcarver's Magazine. 

 1989 - Vesterheim Norwegian American Museum, Blue ribbon for “Man at Grindstone” figure 

1989 - Vesterheim Norwegian American Museum, White ribbon for “Woodcarver at his bench” figure
1990 - Vesterheim Norwegian American Museum, Blue ribbon for “Woodcutter” figure
1991 - Vesterheim Norwegian American Museum, Blue ribbon for “Old Time Photographer” figure
1991 - International Woodcarver’s Congress, Cecil Wakefield Award for Unusual Interpretation
1991 - Vesterheim Norwegian American Museum, Decora, IA, Gold Medal Award  
1992 - International Woodcarver's Congress, Featured Show Exhibit
1993 - International Woodcarver's Congress, Best in Caricature
1994 - International Woodcarver's Congress, Best in Caricature
1995 - International Woodcarver's Congress, Peoples Choice Award
1995 - Vesterheim Norwegian American Museum, Decora, IA, People’s Choice Award 
1995 - International Woodcarver's Congress, Best in Caricature
1996 - Artistry in Wood, Dayton, OH,  Peoples Choice Award
1996 - International Woodcarver's Congress, Best in Caricature
1997 - International Woodcarver's Congress, Second Show Runner-up
1997 - International Woodcarver's Congress, Best in Caricature
1998 - International Woodcarver's Congress, Flexcut Creativity Award
1998 - International Woodcarver's Congress, Best in Caricature
1998 - International Woodcarver's Congress, Best in Caricature
2002 - International Woodcarver's Congress, Featured Show Exhibit
2002 - International Woodcarver's Congress, First Show Runner-up
2002 - International Woodcarver's Congress, Best in Caricature
2003 - International Woodcarver's Congress, Cecil Wakefield Award for Unusual Interpretation
2003 - International Woodcarver's Congress, Best in Caricature
2004 - International Woodcarver's Congress, Best in Caricature
2005 - International Woodcarver's Congress, Best in Caricature
2006 - Woodcarving Illustrated Magazine, Woodcarver of the Year
2007 - International Woodcarver's Congress, Best in Caricature
2008 - International Woodcarver's Congress, Best in Caricature and Judges Choice
2009 - International Woodcarver's Congress, Second Place Stylized Carving and First Place Caricature Group

References

American woodcarvers
People from Le Sueur County, Minnesota
Living people
1939 births
People from Faribault, Minnesota